This is a list of high schools in the state of Nevada.

Carson City
Carson High School, Carson City
Sierra Lutheran High School, Carson City
Silver State High School, Carson City

Churchill County
Churchill County High School, Fallon
Oasis Academy, Fallon, NV

Clark County

Boulder City High School, Boulder City
Indian Springs High School, Indian Springs
Laughlin High School, Laughlin
Moapa Valley High School, Overton
Valley High School, Winchester
Virgin Valley High School, Mesquite

Henderson

Basic High School
Community College South High School
Coronado High School
Foothill High School
Green Valley High School
The Henderson International School
Liberty High School
Southeast Career Technical Academy

Las Vegas

Public Schools

Advanced Technologies Academy
Arbor View High School
Bonanza High School
Centennial High School
Chaparral High School
Cimarron-Memorial High School
Clark High School
College of Southern Nevada High School
Del Sol High School
Desert Oasis High School
Desert Pines High School
ESL Academy
Las Vegas Academy
Nevada State High School (Henderson, Downtown, Southwest, Summerlin, Sunrise)
Northwest Career and Technical Academy
Palo Verde High School
Shadow Ridge High School
Silverado High School
Southwest Career and Technical Academy
Veterans Tribute Career & Technical Academy
West Career and Technical Academy
West Prep High School
Western High School

Private Schools

Bishop Gorman High School
Faith Lutheran Middle School & High School
La Madre Mountain School
The Meadows School
Morris-Sunset East High School
Odyssey Secondary Charter School

North Las Vegas

Canyon Springs High School
Cheyenne High School
Jeffrey-Sunset North High School
Legacy High School
Mojave High School
Rancho High School

Spring Valley

Durango High School
Sierra Vista High School
Spring Valley High School

Sunrise Manor

East Career & Technical Academy
Eldorado High School
Las Vegas High School
Sunrise Mountain High School

Douglas County
Douglas High School, Minden
Jacobsen High School, China Springs
Sierra Crest Academy, Minden
Whitell High School, Zephyr Cove

Elko County
Carlin High School, Carlin
Elko High School, Elko
Independence High School, Elko
Jackpot High School, Jackpot
Owyhee High School, Owyhee
Spring Creek High School, Elko
Wells High School, Wells
West Wendover High School, Wendover

Esmeralda County
No high school; non-home schooled students attend Tonopah High School

Eureka County
Crescent Valley Elementary School, Crescent Valley
Eureka County High School, Eureka
Eureka Elementary School, Eureka

Humboldt County
Albert M. Lowry High School, Winnemucca
McDermitt Combined School, McDermitt

 Denio, Nevada parents with high school aged children may either send their children to Crane Union High School, a public boarding school in Oregon, or for the time being move to Winnemucca, Nevada so their children can attend Lowry.

Lander County
Austin High School, Austin
Battle Mountain High School, Battle Mountain

Lincoln County
C. O. Bastian High School, Caliente
Lincoln County High School, Panaca
Pahranagat Valley High School, Alamo

Lyon County
Dayton High School, Dayton
Fernley High School, Fernley
Silver Stage High School, Silver Springs
Smith Valley High School, Smith
Yerington High School, Yerington

Mineral County
Mineral County High School, Hawthorne
Sky View Academy, Babbit

Nye County
Amargosa Valley School
Beatty High School, Beatty
Gabbs High School, Gabbs
Pahrump Valley High School, Pahrump
Round Mountain Jr/Sr High School, Round Mountain
Tonopah High School, Tonopah

Pershing County
Pershing County High School, Lovelock

Storey County
 Virginia City High School, Virginia City

Washoe County
 Washoe County School District
Coral Academy of Science, Reno
Damonte Ranch High School, Reno
Galena High School, Reno
Hug High School, Reno
Incline High School, Incline Village
McQueen High School, Reno
North Valleys High School, Reno
Reed High School, Sparks
Reno High School, Reno
Spanish Springs High School, Sparks
Sparks High School, Sparks
TMCC High School, Reno
Washoe High School, Reno
Wooster High School, Reno
Academy for Career Education Charter School, Sparks
Bishop Manogue High School, Reno
Gerlach High, Gerlach
Nevada State High School, Reno
Pyramid Lake High School, Nixon
Sage Ridge School, Reno

White Pine County
Lund Junior/Senior High School, Lund
Steptoe Valley High School, Ely
White Pine High School, Ely

References

Nevada
High schools